The Rajyadhikara Party is a political party, comprising BC, SC, ST and Minorities established in 2007, India by V. G. R. Naragoni as its national president. And its National Vice President is Shaik Ismail. The Party was formed mainly to represent and empower the Bahujans (literally meaning "People in majority"), referring to people from the Scheduled Castes, Scheduled Tribes and Other Backward Castes (OBC), as well as religious Minorities that together consist of 85% of India's population

The party claims to be inspired by the philosophy of B. R. Ambedkar, Mahatma Jyotiba Phule, Sir Syed Ahmed Khan and Kanshi Ram.

Party history 
Even after India attaining Independence from the British Raj in 1947, India is governed  till today either by Indian National Congress or Bharatiya Janata Party, dominated by some upper castes (15% of population), or by only one family for a long time. This created a wide disparity in Socio-Economical development between Forward Caste and Backward Classes in India. Backward Classes, comprising 52% of population (consisting of 94 castes), neither came to power by floating a political parties before nor democratically elected member of Backward Classes community was allowed to become the prime minister of India through Indian National Congress or Bharatiya Janata Party. In fact, 85% of India's Backward Classes do not have any representation in either of Indian Parliament (Loksabha and Rajya Sabha). VGR Naragoni floated a party Rajyadhikara Party way back in 2007 to represent BC, SC, ST and Minorities to achieve political power to bring social, political, and economical developments to the backward and weaker sections of the Indian states.

Strategy 
The Rajyadhikara Party (AIRP) was founded on 18 June 2007 by VGR Naragoni with the inspiration of sri Kanshiramji and with the vision of B. R. Ambedkar, Mahatma Jyotiba Phule, and Sir Syed Ahmed Khan
Speaking of lesser-known figures from the Indian Rebellion of 1857 who have been used as Dalit icons, the social scientist Badri Narayan Tiwari has noted that

Party aims 
The party aims in equal political and proportionate representation to all classes and caste of the people discarding the differences between the communities and religions in India to achieve Equal Justice, Human rights and Social equality which is dream of Dr Baba Saheb Ambedkar. The Party is working with vision of Dr.BR Ambedkar saheb and Manyashri Kanshiramji to achieve the political power in the proportion of the population of the castes and communities. Since most of the BC, SC and ST are residing in villages and rural areas engaged as agricultural labour, more emphasis to be given on Villages particularly on Agriculture. Also the literacy percent is comparatively less in these communities much more emphasis has to be given on these issues. The party will work on these by achieving Rajyadhikar.

Latest News
The Party executives at its general body meeting held at Vijayawada on 16 May 2018 re-elected VGR Naragoni as party's National President, Shaik Ismail as National Vice President and Salim Basha as National General Secretary. National President VGR Naragoni said, since the population of BC, SC, ST and Minorities is 85%, the same percentage of seats should be allotted to them in all state assemblies and Lok sabha. He reassured that the party will fight for that cause.

In his address National Vice President Shaik Ismail said in 2019 general elections the party will be fielding its candidates in all the assembly and lok sabha constituencies in Andhra Pradesh, Telangana and Karnataka States. Also he said, it is the time to unite all the BC, SC, ST and Minorities to fight for their empowerment.

References

http://www.rajyadhikaraparty.com    -- <official website>
https://web.archive.org/web/20120426005852/http://www.rajyadhikaraparty.com/    -- <official website>

http://www.greatandhra.com/ganews/viewnews.php?id=1781&scat=18
http://andhracafe.com/index.php?m=show&id=30079

Political parties established in 2007
Political parties in Andhra Pradesh
2007 establishments in Andhra Pradesh